Joseph Martin Waters (born 1952) is an American classical composer.  He also mounts experimental electronic music festivals attempting to bridge the gap between contemporary popular genres and the avant-garde Western classical tradition.

Creative Projects
In 2011 Orchestra Nova conductor Jung-Ho Pak commissioned Waters to create a double concerto for violin (featuring Lindsay Deutsch) and alto saxophone (featuring Todd Rewoldt) on the subject of the ocean.  The resultant work, entitled "Surf" was premiered by the orchestra on May 11, 12 & 14, 2012.   
"Surf" also featured live electronics, performed by the composer, and live video created by Brooklyn artist Zuriel Waters and performed via software created by Chris Warren.

In 2003 the city of San Diego commissioned sculptor Roman De Salvo, along with Waters, to create a public artwork in the form of a safety railing on the civilian overpass on Interstate 94 at 25th Street.  
Entitled Crab Carillon, the result is a set of 488 tuned chimes, that can be played by pedestrians as they cross the overpass.  Each chime is tuned to the note of a melody, composed by Waters.  
The melody is in the form of a [palindrome], to accommodate walking in either direction.  
The music can be heard on the City of San Diego Civic Art Collection

He performs and composes for the Waters_Bluestone_Duel, a collaboration with percussionist Joel Bluestone that explores the combination of live electronics and percussion, 
as well as SWARMIUS an interdisciplinary quartet comprising Felix Olschofka (violin), Todd Rewoldt (alto saxophone), Joel Bluestone (classical percussion) and Waters (composer and electronics performance).

His work has been performed at venues which include: Australasian Computer Music Conferences Melbourne & Perth (Australia), Beethoven-Haus (Bonn Germany), Bomb the Space Festival Wellington (New Zealand), Composer's Hall Moscow Conservatory (Russia), Festival Internacional Cervantino Guanajuato (Mexico), Hong Kong Cultural Center, Hungarian Radio hosted Budapest & Nadasdy Castle (Hungary), Ljubljana Cultural Center (Slovenia), Rosario & San Martin de los Andes (Argentina), SEAMS Fylkingen Stockholm (Sweden), Joe's Pub (New York City), Southern Theater Minneapolis, Theater Kikker (Utrecht Netherlands), Tsing Hua University (Beijing China), UNAM (Mexico City), University of Cadiz & Conservatorio Superior de Musica Valencia (Spain), Univ of Chile (Santiago), Wellington (New Zealand), Venetto Jazz Festival & Acadamia di Canto (Venice Italy), Warsaw Electronic Festival (Poland), and other locations ...

Music for Dance
Tere Mathern Dance Company Elements 2004 Portland, OR & San Diego, CA

Leslie Seiters, Ron Estes, Justin Morrison, Niamh Condron with SWARMIUS, 2008 Neurosciences Institute, La Jolla, CA

Music for Experimental Film
Kali Yuga (2000, pixilation and object animation)  Directed, produced and animated by Joanna Priestley.  Kali Yuga was a performance and animation collaboration with filmmaker Joanna Priestley, composer Joseph Waters and contemporary classical ensemble, Fear No Music. It included physical performances by the musicians (playing upside down in wooden contraptions, dropping a bowling ball from the top of a ladder into a vat of pennies) with projected animation. The pixillation of yogi Diane Wilson was shot over six months in the forests and parks near Portland, Oregon. The object animation was an experiment using household tools, bolts, screws and nails. Kali Yuga is a modern score in the style of classic 1940s cartoons. It placed virtuosic demands on the performers, with 150 synchronization points. Kali Yuga was performed at Reed College, Northwest Film Center, University of Oregon and the San Diego State University.
 
Bob (2001, Directed and produced by Matt Smith).  Music performed live by Fear no Music ensemble at Reed College and San Diego State University.

Festival Presentation
In 1983 Waters co-founded Network for New Music (NNM) (along with pianist Dr. Linda Reichert).  Based in Philadelphia, NNM was originally a support and service organization for living composers.  Waters co-managed NNM until 1988, when he left to pursue other projects.  Under Reichert, NNM continues today as a professional chamber music ensemble dedicated to the commissioning and performance of new works.

In 1998 Waters founded and is currently artistic director of,  NWEAMO (New West Electronic Arts & Music Organization). 
NWEAMO is a festival in which composers, performance artists and musicians present their work with the aim of integrating avant-garde classical, popular, experimental electronic music and visual media.  The NWEAMO festival has traveled to Berlin, Boulder (CO), Mexico City, Miami (FL), Morelia (Mexico), New York City, Portland (OR), San Diego (CA),  Stony Brook (NY), Venice (Italy) and Tokyo (Japan).

Academic Position
Professor of Music (Composition and Computer music) at San Diego State University (San Diego, California, U.S.A.)

Education
Waters studied composition at Yale University (M.M. 1982), the Universities of Oregon (Ph.D. 2002) and Minnesota (B.S. 1980), as well as Stockholms Musikpedagogiska Institut. Primary teachers were Jacob Druckman, Bernard Rands, Roger Reynolds, Dominick Argento, and Martin Bresnick.  He began his career as a teenage keyboardist and composer for rock bands.

Discography

SWARMIUS III: Trans Classical (2017) Carrotwood Records, VOIC007, featuring the SWARMIUS Ensemble & guest artists: Michael Couper (soprano & alto saxophone), Todd Rewoldt (alto saxophone), Andrew Kreysa (vibraphone), Toni James (Piano), Sarah Davis Draper (harp), Justin DeHart (Tabla), Joel Bluestone (tubular bells)

SWARMIUS – Pacific 565 (2014) Aleppo Recordings, VOIC006, featuring the SWARMIUS Ensemble: Todd Rewoldt (alto saxophone), Andrew Kreysa (vibraphone), Sarah Davis Draper (harp & pipe organ), Ian & Sean Bassett (electric guitar), Pamela Narbona (vocals)

SWARMIUS – in Starlight (2013) Aleppo Recordings, VOIC005, featuring the SWARMIUS Ensemble: Todd Rewoldt (alto saxophone), Michael Couper (soprano saxophone), Justin DeHart (vibraphone), Sarah Davis Draper (harp)

SWARMIUS – Dragon (2013) Aleppo Recordings, VOIC004, featuring the SWARMIUS Ensemble: Todd Rewoldt (alto saxophone), Felix Olschofka (violin), Joel Bluestone (xylophone, tubular bells) & Joseph Waters (electronics via laptop computer)

Trio Neos: Punto De Encuentro (Meeting Place) (2011) CMMAS Recordings, CMMAS_CD006, featuring  Trio Neos, Various Artists commissioned by Trio Neos (Mexico City), includes On the Transient Nature of Magic, for bass clarinet, bassoon, piano and electronics by Joseph Waters

SWARMIUS II  – also normal (2010) Aleppo Recordings, VOIC003, featuring the SWARMIUS Ensemble: Todd Rewoldt, Felix Olschofka, Joel Bluestone, Joseph Waters with guest vocalists Leonard Patton, Kira Riches and Nina Deering

SWARMIUS Presents the Waters_Bluestone_Duel – Fill The House (2009) Aleppo Recordings, VOIC002, featuring  Joel Bluestone, percussion and Joseph Waters, live electronics

SWARMIUS (2008) Aleppo Recordings, VOIC001, featuring the SWARMIUS Ensemble: Todd Rewoldt, Felix Olschofka, Joel Bluestone, Joseph Waters

Offshore (2006) Albany Records, TROY813, featuring the Bakken Trio, Todd Kuhns, Ron Blessinger, Susan Smith & Philip Hansen

Joseph Waters (2001) North Pacific Music, NPM LD 009

Alejandro Escuer: Aqua — Musica para flauta y electronica (2002) Quindecim Recordings, QP091.  Various Artists commissioned by Alejandro Escuer, includes Dream in Aqua & Scarlet by Joseph Waters

Playerless Pianos (2005) North Pacific Music, NDM LP 007 — Seventh Species Composers Series, Various Artists collection, includes Counterpoint Studies: Trochilidae • Variations on a Bebop Theme • Counterpoint in F by Joseph Waters

References
The Mystical and the Political Realms Collide in Waters’ New Border Opera ‘El Colibrí Mágico’, Ken Herman, reviewer (San Diego Story) October 15, 2019.  http://www.sandiegostory.com/the-mystical-and-the-political-realms-collide-in-waters-new-border-opera-el-colibri-magico/

St. Francis of Assisi-inspired opera set in Tijuana's red light district debuts Friday (March 14, 2017), George Varga (Music Journalist), The San Diego Union Tribune

Electronic music band Swarmius borrows from Bach in first-ever single (November 16, 2016), Jim Bessman (music journalist), Centerline

San Diego’s Next Wave: Collaboration (October 20, 2014), Ken Hermen (music critic), San Diego Story

Raccoons In The Pool (January 22, 2014), Dave Good (music critic), San Diego Reader/Blurt Music News/SDSU

Professor Joseph Waters' Swarmius gives Hunter College kids a lesson (October 21, 2012), Jim Bessman (Manhattan Local Music Examiner), Examiner/Arts & Entertainment/Music

"Surf" — Swarmius takes Orchestra Nova to the Beach (May 14, 2012), Dave Good (music critic), San Diego Reader/Jam Session/Classical Music/Concert Reviews

The composer speaks: Joseph Waters on ‘Surf’ (May 2, 2012), James Chute (classical music critic), San Diego Union Tribune/UTSanDiego.com

Mark Applebaum’s experiment works in NWEAMO festival (March 1, 2012), James Chute (classical music critic), San Diego Union Tribune/Classical Music

SHARING THE EXCITEMENT OF NEW MUSIC—NWEAMO welcomes audience to don mask, take a name, whistle and listen (Feb. 23, 2012), James Chute (classical music critic), San Diego Union Tribune/Classical Music

SWARMIUS in The Cell (June 22, 2011), Geoffrey Burleson (classical music critic), Sequenza21/The Contemporary Classical Music Community

‘East Meets West’ in a pop-classical music festival (February 23, 2011), James Chute (Classical Music and Arts), The San Diego Union Tribune

They put the 'cut' in cutting-edge work (September 27, 2009), George Varga (pop music critic), The San Diego Union Tribune

A composer's lifelong quest: Moving the music forward (January 27, 2008), James Chute (arts editor), The San Diego Union Tribune

Listings: Rock, pop & soul  (October 30-November 5, 2008), Adam Feldman, Time Out New York

Cutting-Edge Fest Gets Sexy, And Artists Rise To The Occasion (October 2, 2008), George Varga, The San Diego Union Tribune

Sounds of Sex (October 1, 2008), Kinsee Morlan (arts and culture editor), San Diego Citybeat

A composer's lifelong quest: Moving the music forward (April 27, 2008), James Chute (arts editor), The San Diego Union Tribune

Found Sound: Bringing Experimental Music to the Masses (September 20, 2006), Kinsee Morlan (arts and culture editor), San Diego CityBeat

Music for the brain, the feet and the gut (October 7, 2005), George Varga (pop music critic), The San Diego Union Tribune

Repunta en México la música electroacústica  (September 20, 2005),  Juan Solís, El Universal (Mexico City)

Hidden San Diego: The 25th Street Musical Bridge (June 15, 2005), Inigo Figuracion, About.com

Instrumental Genius (October 5, 2004), George Varga (pop music critic), The San Diego Union Tribune

Tickling Aural Tunnels(June 30, 2004), www.jagg.co.nz (New Zealand)

'Mathern's 'Elements' is electric, exhilarating (Mary 15, 2004), Catherine Thomas, The Oregonian

Of Note (March 25, 2004), Dave Good, San Diego Reader

Music to stimulate and inspire (March 14, 2004), George Varga (pop music critic), The San Diego Union Tribune

Electro-acoustic music fest puts classical, folk on same family tree (October 3, 2003), Kyle O'Brien, The Oregonian

Aiming for 'far reaches' of the music world (October 5, 2003), George Varga (pop music critic), The San Diego Union Tribune

Classical Music Review: New Releases (June 25, 2004), Tony Gualtieri, ww.classical-music-review.org

Of Note! (March 25, 2004), Dave Good, San Diego Reader

Bridge Chimes in with travel music (June 14, 2003), Kristen Green (staff writer), The San Diego Union Tribune

Chimes provide traveling music on bridge (June 24, 2003) Kristen Green (staff writer), The San Diego Union Tribune

Public Art in San Diego (November 2003, page 14), San Diego Magazine

New West's electronic take puts new face on avant-garde (October 6, 2003) Kyle O'Brien, The Oregonian

Hiss & Vinegar:  Finding NWEAMO (October 1, 2003), Portland News & Culture,  Willamette Week (Portland, OR)

Triumph of the Machines:  Experimental electronic + avant-garde classical + really weird gadgets + NWEAMO (October 2, 2002), Ben Munat, Willamette Week (Portland, OR)

Classical Music: Bakken programs new works (July 21, 2002), Michael Anthony (staff writer), Minneapolis Star Tribune

Letting the music in: Avant-garde prof takes tradition out for a spin (February 8, 2002), George Varga (pop music critic), The San Diego Union Tribune

I'm a classical composer who grew up playing in rock bands (December 6, 2001), Dave Good, The San Diego Reader

Music:  The Future of What?  A brave  young music festival strains at the boundary between the conservatory and the dance floor  (October 16, 2001), Zach Dundas, Willamette Week (Portland, OR)

Monsters of Powerbook (October 12, 2001), John Foyston, The Oregonian

Critics Choice: Listen up:  Electro-acoustic music fest jams again (October 5, 2001), John Foyston, The Oregonian

Calling All Electro-Geeks (October 4, 2001), Katie Shimer,  Portland Mercury (OR)

Pianofest toasts talent for breaking the rules (March 19, 2001), Grant Menzies,  The Oregonian

Fear No Music composer-in-residence Joe Waters bids farewell to Portland with a mischievous score to film-maker Matt Smith's tree-of-life fable, 'Bob' (March 14, 2001), Bill Smith, Willamette Week (Portland, OR)

New Music/Research Day:  Wired for Percussion (October 10, 2001), Peggy Benskeser, Percussive Notes: The Journal of the Percussive Arts Society  Vol 39, No 5

This Week's Spotlight (January 25, 2001), editor, SEQUENZA/21 The Contemporary Classical Music Weekly

Fear No Music strings along Reed audience (November 19, 2000) James McQuillen, The Oregonian

La emoción de lo contemporáneo (July 23, 2000), Sergio Torrigino, La Capital (Rosario Argentina)

Joseph Waters en concierto con el ensamble Rosario en Aricana (July 23, 2000, Fernanda González Cortiñas, Rosario (Argentina)

Piano Riot' gets animated (March 10, 2000), David Stabler, The Oregonian

Fear No Music lets loose with outrageous score and cinema in 'Pianarchy' (March 17, 2000, James McQuillen,  The Oregonian

Live Review: Pianos at an Exhibition, Fear No Music (March 15, 2000), Bill Smith, Willamette Week (Portland OR)

Kali Yuga captivates (September 22, 2000) James McQuillen,  The Oregonian

Electric Bugaloo (October 6, 1999),  Bill Smith, Willamette Week (Portland, OR)

Waters' music is fast, theatrical and loud (February 1, 1999), David Stabler (music critic), The Oregonian

Record Reviews(September 20, 2000), Bill Smith, Willamette Week (Portland, OR)

Joe Waters puts chamber music instrumentation in a room with computer-generated soundscapes.  The result is the second annual Northwest Electro-Acoustic Music Organization Festival (September 13, 2000), Bill Smith,  Willamette Week (Portland, OR)

Brave New Electro-acoustic world (September 15, 2000), The Oregonian

Music Review: Choir Celebrates in Song (October 28, 1996), David Stabler,  The Oregonian

External links
 http://www.sandiegouniontribune.com/entertainment/music/sd-et-radar-nweamo-festival-20170310-story.html
 http://www.centerline.news/single-post/2016/11/22/Electronic-music-band-Swarmius-borrows-from-Bach-in-first-ever-single
 http://www.sandiegostory.com/san-diegos-next-wave-collaboration/
 http://www.sandiegoreader.com/news/2014/jan/22/blurt-raccoons-pool/
 http://www.sandiegoreader.com/weblogs/jam-session/2012/may/14/surf-swarmius-takes-orchestra-nova-to-the-beach/
 http://www.utsandiego.com/news/2012/may/02/Joseph-Waters-Surf/?print&page=all
 http://www.utsandiego.com/news/2012/mar/01/SDSU-NWEAMO-festival/
 http://www.utsandiego.com/news/2012/feb/23/tp-sharing-the-excitement-of-new-music/
 http://www.sequenza21.com/2011/06/swarmius-in-the-cell/
 http://www.signonsandiego.com/news/2011/feb/23/SDSU-Tribeca-new-music
 http://legacy.signonsandiego.com/uniontrib/20080127/news_1a27sdsu.html
 
 http://www.classical-music-review.org/reviews/Waters.html
 http://www.paristransatlantic.com/magazine/monthly2006/06jun_text.html
 http://www.theharbinger.org/xix/001128/smith.html
 http://www3.signonsandiego.com/stories/2009/sep/27/they-put-8216cut8217-cutting-edge-work/
 https://web.archive.org/web/20110727022921/http://www.thevillagenews.com/story/40902/
 https://web.archive.org/web/20061230045323/http://www.sandiego.gov/arts-culture/installations.shtml
 http://socialight.com/m/note/2009/3/26/r2b4s
 https://web.archive.org/web/20091102220000/http://networkfornewmusic.org/news-press
 https://web.archive.org/web/20081122090543/http://voiceofsandiego.org/articles/2007/06/16/arts/962robbins061407.txt
 http://www.theremin.ru/posters/1998/alternativa98.htm
 http://www.eugeneweekly.com/2006/12/21/music.html
 https://web.archive.org/web/20110707074022/http://www.abcveneto.com/abcveneto2007/articoli/maggio07/ultimaora/venice-europe.html
 https://web.archive.org/web/20100926163125/http://openlens.proscenia.net/07archive/Joanna_Priestley.htm
 https://web.archive.org/web/20080829134954/http://wweek.com/html/perf031401.html
 http://www.answers.com/topic/offshore-chamber-works-by-joseph-waters

21st-century classical composers
20th-century classical composers
American male classical composers
American classical composers
University of Minnesota alumni
1952 births
Living people
Pupils of Jacob Druckman
21st-century American composers
20th-century American composers
20th-century American male musicians
21st-century American male musicians